Arnoldichthys spilopterus, the Niger tetra, is a characin endemic to Nigeria. It is the only member of its genus.

Description and ecology
Arnoldichthys spilopterus is a tropical freshwater species found only in a limited number of locations in Nigeria (Ogun and Niger rivers). Its diet consists of worms, insects, and crustaceans. Females in captivity can lay about 1,000 eggs, which hatch within 30–34 hours.

Conservation
This species is currently classified as endangered by the IUCN due to its limited range coupled with losses to the aquarium trade and ongoing habitat degradation.

References

Alestidae
Freshwater fish of West Africa
Endemic fauna of Nigeria
Fish described in 1909
Species endangered by the pet trade